John Hunyadi, Jr. (c. 1419 – 1440 or 1441) was a Hungarian noble and knight banneret from the House of Hunyadi, younger brother of regent John Hunyadi as the second son of Vajk (Voyk) and Erzsébet (Elizabeth) Morzsinai (Morsina/Marsina).

There is little information about him. He was first mentioned in the charter issued for four members of his family on 12 February 1419. He was appointed Ban of Severin (Szörény) by King Albert in 1439, along with his brother. Thereafter he participated in his brother's early campaigns against the Ottomans. He was probably killed in a battle in this capacity in 1440 or 1441. He was buried in Gyulafehérvár (today: Alba Iulia, Romania). His brother wrote of him as "the valiant of the valiant", showing that John the younger was regarded a brave soldier.

References

Sources
  Engel, Pál (1996). Magyarország világi archontológiája, 1301–1457, I. ("Secular Archontology of Hungary, 1301–1457, Volume I"). História, MTA Történettudományi Intézete. Budapest. .
 Kubinyi, András (2008). Matthias Rex. Balassi Kiadó. .

1419 births
1440s deaths
Medieval Hungarian soldiers
John, Jr.
Burials at St. Michael's Cathedral, Alba Iulia
Hungarian knights
15th-century Hungarian nobility
Bans of Severin
Military personnel killed in action